The papal bull Dundum ad nostram audientiam was promulgated by Eugene IV on August 8, 1442. It advocated the complete social separation of Jews and Christians and created a legal basis for the creation of Jewish ghettos in Europe. The later papal bull Cum nimis absurdum built on Dundum ad nostram audientiam to create the Jewish ghetto of Rome in the Papal States.

Documents of Pope Eugene IV
15th-century papal bulls
Christianity and law in the 15th century
Antisemitism in Italy
1442 works